At Home may refer to:

Books
 At Home, a book of collected essays by Gore Vidal
 At Home, a recipe book by Heston Blumenthal
 At Home (book), a 2022 cookbook by Gavin Kaysen and Nick Fauchald
 At Home: A Short History of Private Life, a 2010 book by Bill Bryson
 "At Home" (short story), an 1887 short story by Anton Chekhov

Film and television
 At Home (TV series), a 1940s television series  
 Heima, a 2007 feature film by Icelandic band Sigur Rós

Music
 Bei uns Z'haus, a waltz composed by Johann Strauss II
 At Home, album by Lambert and Nuttycombe 1970
 At Home (Cherish the Ladies album), 1999
 At Home (Shocking Blue album), 1969
 At Home (Avishai Cohen album), an album by Avishai Cohen
 At Home (With Family), an album by Eddie Hazel
 "At Home" (song), a 2011 song by Crystal Fighters

Companies and organizations
 At Home, a program for homeless people with mental illnesses by the Mental Health Commission of Canada
 At Home (store), an American chain of home decor stores.

See also
 @Home (disambiguation)